Cristian Todea (born 18 October 1978) is a Romanian former football midfielder.

Honours

UTA Arad
Liga II: 2001–02

AC Mantova
Serie C2: 2003–04

References

External links
Hattrick.com profile 

1978 births
Living people
Sportspeople from Arad, Romania
Romanian footballers
Association football midfielders
Liga I players
Liga II players
FC UTA Arad players
CS Gaz Metan Mediaș players
Serie C players
Mantova 1911 players
Swiss Challenge League players
AC Bellinzona players
Romanian expatriate footballers
Romanian expatriate sportspeople in Italy
Expatriate footballers in Italy
Romanian expatriate sportspeople in Switzerland
Expatriate footballers in Switzerland
Romanian football managers
FC UTA Arad managers
CS Național Sebiș managers